Moonhaven is a dystopic sci-fi series produced by AMC+ that premiered on July 7, 2022. The series depicts a quasi-utopian community set on a part of the Moon, intended to develop the technical and cultural means to save a ravaged Earth. The first episode begins with a murder, and the first season develops around a pivotal event for this project on the Moon, called the Bridge, when the first generations of Mooners, as the people from this community are called, will go back to Earth to teach the Earthers a way to overcome their ecological and economic crisis.

The series is directed by Peter Ocko, and cast actors such as Dominic Monaghan, Emma McDonald, Kadeem Hardison, Amara Karan and Joe Manganiello.

On July 28, 2022 it was reported that the series has been renewed for a second season by AMC+. A few months later, the series was canceled as AMC+ decided to not move forward with the second season.

Premise
The series is set three generations after settlers left a dying Earth to build a 500-square-mile colony on the moon. Rather than eyeing the lunar surface as a potential Earth replacement, the community of Moonhaven was sent with a powerful artificial intelligence system designed to find solutions for Earth’s problems. As the pilot begins, a younger generation of moon settlers is on the verge of returning to Earth with what they’ve learned, a last-gasp humanitarian mission.

Cast 
 Dominic Monaghan as Paul Serno, a detective in Moonhaven
 Emma McDonald as Bella Sway, an Earth space pilot
 Amara Karan as Indira Mare, Earth's Envoy of the IO
 Ayelet Zurer as Maite Voss, Chair of Moonhaven's leadership council
 Kadeem Hardison as Arlo Noon, a detective in Moonhaven
 Yazzmin Newell as Sonda Crux, Voss' second in command
 Joe Manganiello as Tomm Schultz, Mare's bodyguard
 Elaine Tan as Lone, Paul Serno's wife
 Bamshad Abedi-Amin as Fritz, a fireman and Lone's lover
 Josh Tedeku as Wish Spur, Paul and Lone's water son; a member of circle 6 of the First Wave
 Martha Malone as Elna, Paul and Lone's water daughter
 Adam Isla O'Brien as Strego Nall, a mooner involved in an anti-Bridge insurrectionist group
 Nina Barker-Francis as Chill Spen, Bella's blood sister; murdered by Strego Nall
 Lilit Lesser as Asus, Chill Spen's water sister
 George Georgiou as Jate Mura, a drug smuggler on earth
 Arthur Lee as Tycho Heller, a councillor overseeing the Bridge
 Amy Ledwidge as Wild Child, an unnamed girl Bella frequently encounters on the fringes of Moonhaven
 Charis Agbonlahor as Loa, Bella Sway and Chill Spen's blood mother; Maite Voss's former girlfriend
 Robyn Holdaway as Blu, an apprentice detective under Paul Serno's supervision
 Seán T. Ó Meallaigh as Sirl, involved in the mooner insurrection
 Helen Roche as Gnoc, Paul Serno's blood mother
 Medivic Bakanababo as Zek, a gazer
 Thom Ashley (as Thom Ashely) as Tello, Blu's father

Episodes

Production

Development
In March 2021 AMC Studios opened a writers' room for Peter Ocko's Moonhaven, for the production of material as part of its scripts-to-series model. Dep Spera signed on as executive producer. On May 11, 2021, the series received a greenlight order from AMC.

On July 28, 2022, it was reported that the series has been renewed for a second season by AMC+. On December 3, 2022, it was announced that the second season renewal had been reversed and AMC+ had decided to cancel the series.

Casting
In July 2021 Dominic Monaghan signed on to star in the series as lead opposite Joe Manganiello, with Emma McDonald announced as to headline the series. Ayelet Zurer was also announced in a key role. Kadeem Hardison was announced as a series regular with Yazzmin Newell also joining the cast as a series regular in September 2021.

Reception
The review aggregator website Rotten Tomatoes reported an 65% approval rating with an average rating of 5.7/10, based on 17 critic reviews. The website's critics consensus reads, "Moonhaven depiction of a utopia is often more goofy than harmonious, although fans of idiosyncratic sci-fi will likely enjoy this trip to the moon." Metacritic, which uses a weighted average, assigned a score of 74 out of 100 based on 10 critics, indicating "generally favorable reviews".

References

External links
 
 
 

Dystopian television series
Serial drama television series
English-language television shows
2020s American drama television series
AMC (TV channel) original programming
2022 American television series debuts
2022 American television series endings
2020s American science fiction television series
Television series set in the future
Television series about the Moon